Thomas Arthur Wilson (born 17 August 1953) is a British gymnast. He competed at the 1976 Summer Olympics and the 1980 Summer Olympics.

References

1953 births
Living people
British male artistic gymnasts
Olympic gymnasts of Great Britain
Gymnasts at the 1976 Summer Olympics
Gymnasts at the 1980 Summer Olympics
Place of birth missing (living people)
Commonwealth Games medallists in gymnastics
Commonwealth Games silver medallists for England
Gymnasts at the 1978 Commonwealth Games
Medallists at the 1978 Commonwealth Games